The Revolution (also known as The American Revolution) is a 2006 American miniseries from The History Channel composed of thirteen episodes which track the American Revolution from the Boston Massacre through the Treaty of Paris, which declared America's independence from Great Britain. The series is narrated by Edward Herrmann.

Cast
Edward Herrmann, as the Narrator

 Mark Collins, as George Washington
 Jason Audette, as Thomas Jefferson
 John H. Bert, as Alexander Hamilton
 Glenn C. Reimer, as John Adams
 James Karcher, as Gen. Benedict Arnold
 Chris O'Brocto as Gen. Horatio Gates
 Jonah Triebwasser, as Gen. Thomas Gage

Episodes
"Boston, Bloody Boston."  The controversies and conflicts leading to war, including the Stamp Act, the Boston Massacre, the Boston Tea Party, and the Battles of Lexington and Concord.
"Rebellion to Revolution."  The Revolutionaries lay siege to Boston; the formation of the Continental Army and the conscription of slaves by both sides.
"Declaring Independence."  Dark and devastating struggles challenge the dreams for independence in 1776.
"American Crisis."  General George Washington gambles on a brilliant yet dangerously daring stroke to save his army and America.
"Path to World War." Benjamin Franklin tries to convince the French to join the fight against Britain; Philadelphia falls to the British; the Americans win a stunning victory at Saratoga and gain a new ally.
"Forging an Army."  Washington struggles to sustain and rebuild his Army at Valley Forge.
"Treason & Betrayal."  General Benedict Arnold betrays the revolution.
"The War Heads South."  The British lay siege to Charleston.
"Hornet's Nest."  War erupts in the Southern Colonies.
"The End Game."  The struggle for independence reaches its climax as both sides are tired of the war.
"Becoming a Nation."  King George III is forced by the parliament to sue for peace and Washington disbands the Continental Army
"Road to the Presidency."  The War is over, but Washington is enlisted for another duty.
"A President and His Revolution."  While Washington is on his way to be inaugurated as the first President of the United States, he looks back at some defining moments in the revolution.

DVD release
The History Channel and A&E Home Video released a four disc DVD set on December 19, 2006, following its series debut on the History Channel.

See also
 List of television series and miniseries about the American Revolution
 List of films about the American Revolution

References

External links
 Official History Channel miniseries website
 

2000s American documentary television series
2006 American television series debuts
Cultural depictions of Alexander Hamilton
Cultural depictions of George Washington
Cultural depictions of John Adams
Cultural depictions of Thomas Jefferson
History (American TV channel) original programming
Television series about the American Revolution